Ornithoptera victoriae, the Queen Victoria's birdwing, is a birdwing butterfly of the family Papilionidae, found in the Solomon Islands and Papua New Guinea (Bougainville Island only).

What was originally described as Ornithoptera allotei, is a natural hybrid between Ornithoptera victoriae and Ornithoptera priamus urvillianus.

History
The Queen Victoria's birdwing was described in 1856 by George Robert Gray. Both the scientific and vernacular names were named in honour of Queen Victoria. The holotype now resides in the Natural History Museum, London.

Description

Wingspan: 150–180 mm

Male: The forewings are black. Next to the wing tip there is a large, green spot. There is a green area around the thorax. The underside of Ornithoptera victoriae is black. The green spot and the green area are combined. At the wing leading edge there is a large black spot. The veins are black. The hindwings are green. The edge of wing is black. At the outer edge there are three golden spots. The underside is green. The veins are partly black. At the outer edge there are three golden spots. Between these golden spots there are black spots. The ventral side of the wings are of very similar appearance to the dorsal side.

The abdomen is yellowish or white. The head and thorax are black.

Female: The general colour of the female is black or dark brown. There are many white spots on the forewings. Next to the thorax there are two yellow stripes. On the hindwings there are two chains of white marks. There is also one yellow spot. As with the male, the ventral side of the wings are quite similar in appearance to the dorsal side.

Typical of birdwing butterflies, the female covers the upper range of the wingspan. It is significantly larger than the male.

Subspecies

 O. v. archeri [Calderara, 1984]
 O. v. epiphanes [Schmid, 1970]
 O. v. isabellae [Rothschild & Jordan, 1901]
 O. v. maramasikensis [Morita, 2000]
 O. v. reginae [Godman & Salvin, 1888]
 O. v. regis [Rothschild, 1895]
 O. v. rubianus [Rothschild, 1904]
 O. v. victoriae

Conservation

The species is not rare, but some populations are declining due to deforestation.

Ornithoptera victoriae is, like all other birdwing butterflies, a strictly protected species. It is listed in Appendix II of CITES, meaning that international trade is restricted to captive-raised specimens. The Solomon Islands, which include a significant part of this species' range, only became a signatory to CITES in 2007, while Papua New Guinea has been a signatory for many years. Despite the fact that the Solomon Islands has engaged the CITES controls, a vestigial United States Fish and Wildlife Service ruling has not been updated and so importation of O. victoriae from the Solomon Islands (but not from Bougainville or Papua New Guinea) to the United States remains prohibited.

Gallery

See also
 Solomon Islands rain forests

References
 D'Abrera, B. (1975). Birdwing Butterflies of the World. Country Life Books, London.

 Haugum, J. & Low, A.M. (1978-1985). A Monograph of the Birdwing Butterflies. 2 volumes. Scandinavian Press, Klampenborg; 663 pp.
 Straatman, R. (1969). Notes on the biology and hostplant associations of Ornithoptera priamus urvilleanus and O. victoriae (Papilionidae) Journal of the Lepidopterists' Society 23: 69 - 76 
 Howarth, Thomas Graham (1977). A list of the type-specimens of Ornithoptera (Lepidoptera: Papilionidae) in the British Museum (Natural History) Bulletin of the British Museum (Natural History). Entomology series 36:153-169 pdf
 Calderara, P. (1984). A new subspecies of Ornithoptera victoriae Gray (Papilionidae) from Choiseul, Solomon Islands. Proceedings and Transactions of the British Entomological and Natural History Society 17: 31-35.
 Other literature at Troides

References

External links

 Entry at Ngypal
 Consortium for the Barcode of Life Barcode of Life
 Pteron Images of nominate, reginae and rubianus.
 Butterflycorner Images from Naturhistorisches Museum Wien
 Troides at Markku Savela
 Solomon Islands Rain Forests Ecoregion

victoriae
Butterflies of Oceania
Insects of the Solomon Islands
Lepidoptera of Papua New Guinea
Taxa named by George Robert Gray
Butterflies described in 1856